Teočak-Krstac is a village in the municipality of Teočak, Bosnia and Herzegovina.

Demographics 
According to the 2013 census, its population was 2,763.

References

Populated places in Teočak